Koster is a small farming town situated on the watershed between the Orange and Limpopo Rivers in North West Province of South Africa.

History
The town was proclaimed in 1913 and named after Bastiaan Koster, the original farm owner. Koster means "church sexton".

Geography
Town 58 km south-west of Rustenburg and 72 km west-north-west of Magaliesburg. It was founded on the farm Kleinfontein in 1913, and has been administered by a village council since January 1931. Said to have been named either after Dr Herman Jacob Coster (1866–1899), State Attorney of the South African Republic, after its surveyor, or after Bastiaan Hendricus Koster, owner of the farm Kleinfontein. The latter explanation seems most plausible.

The Elands River, the Koster River and the Mooi River have their sources near the town.

Arms

References

Heine-Lize Becker

Populated places in the Kgetlengrivier Local Municipality
Populated places established in 1913
1913 establishments in South Africa